Systema Mycologicum is a systematic classification of fungi drawn up in 1821 by the Swedish mycologist and botanist Elias Fries. It took 11 years to complete.

References

External links
Systema Mycologicum at biodiversitylibrary.org

Mycological literature